In enzymology, a phosphoribosyl-ATP diphosphatase is an enzyme that catalyzes the chemical reaction

1-(5-phosphoribosyl)-ATP + H2O  1-(5-phosphoribosyl)-AMP + diphosphate

Thus, the two substrates of this enzyme are 1-(5-phosphoribosyl)-ATP and H2O, whereas its two products are 1-(5-phosphoribosyl)-AMP and diphosphate.

This enzyme participates in histidine metabolism.  It employs one cofactor, H+.

Nomenclature 

This enzyme belongs to the family of hydrolases, specifically those acting on acid anhydrides in phosphorus-containing anhydrides.  The systematic name of this enzyme class is 1-(5-phosphoribosyl)-ATP diphosphohydrolase. Other names in common use include phosphoribosyl-ATP pyrophosphatase, and phosphoribosyladenosine triphosphate pyrophosphatase.

References 

 

EC 3.6.1
Enzymes of known structure